Shi Fangjing is a former world level women's badminton player from China.

Career
A doubles specialist, Shi Fangjing won both women's doubles and mixed doubles at the Polish Open consecutively in 1985 and 1986, each with a different partner. Her biggest titles in badminton, however, all came with countryman Wang Pengren in mixed doubles. They were the surprise gold medalists at the 1987 IBF World Championships in Beijing, and subsequently captured the Badminton World Cup in both 1987 and 1988, the Swedish Open, World Badminton Grand Prix, the venerable All England Championships in 1988, and the French Open in 1989. In defense of their title, they were bronze medalists (semifinalists) at the next edition of the IBF World Championships in 1989.

References

Chinese female badminton players
Living people
Asian Games medalists in badminton
1965 births
Badminton players from Shanghai
Badminton players at the 1990 Asian Games
Badminton players at the 1988 Summer Olympics
Asian Games gold medalists for China
Asian Games bronze medalists for China
Medalists at the 1990 Asian Games